Sightings is an American paranormal and news television show that originally aired in the 1990s. The show began as a special titled The UFO Report: Sightings on October 17, 1991, as well as eventual follow up reports, Ghost Report and the Psychic Experience. The original Concept Creator and Supervising Producer of that hour special produced by Paramount for Fox TV was Linda Moulton Howe, an Emmy Award-winning TV producer and documentary filmmaker of TV specials about science and the environment. One of her Emmy Award-winning broadcasts was A Strange Harvest (KMGH-TV in May 1980), about the worldwide animal-mutilation mystery linked by law enforcement to extraterrestrial biological entities.

Show history
After the special broadcast to high ratings, it went forward into weekly TV production as the program Sightings. The show featured everything from UFOs to ghosts to Bigfoot in an investigative news format and was hosted by reporter Tim White. The show was created by Ann Daniels Productions, Fair Dinkum Productions (Winkler-Daniel Productions from 1991–93), and Paramount Domestic Television (Wilshire Court Productions from 1992–93) . Its executive producers were Henry Winkler and Ann Daniel.

The program began on Fox in 1992, in a 30-minute-long format that aired on Friday nights. When the show was put into syndication in 1994, it was extended to an hour-long format and was on at various times. In 1996, it was picked up by Sci Fi Channel. Sightings was cancelled in 1997 (although five special episodes aired in 1998), and reruns continued on the Sci Fi Channel until April 2003.

In 1998, the producers made a new UFO special that aired on UPN, called Danger in Our Skies: The New UFO Threat hosted by Jim Forbes.

In 2003, a program called Unexplained Mysteries debuted in syndication. Although it did not have the same hosted news format like Sightings, it was produced by many of the same individuals involved with Sightings, and sometimes reused footage and graphics from the earlier program.

Episodes

Home media
There have been three home video releases of the Sightings television show: Sightings: The UFO Report, Sightings: The Ghost Report, and Sightings: The Psychic Experience. The videos were repackaged segments from season one and two of the television show. All three videos were originally released in 1996 on VHS tapes.

Merchandise
Two books were released in 1997 related to the Sightings television show - Sightings: Beyond Imagination Lies the Truth and Sightings: UFOs.
One software product was released related to the Sightings television show called Sightings: UFOPedia. The software included pictures, reports, footage, and never before seen footage from the show in an encyclopedia format.
A line of clothing was released related to the Sightings television show that included T-shirts. The shirts would have either a ghost, alien, or psychic on the front with the word Sightings.
Textile posters were sold related to the "Sightings" television show produced by Heart Rock S.r.l. - Italy. The posters were silk and featured the "Sightings" logo along with the illustrations that were on the VHS tape box covers (an alien, a ghost, or a psychic). The posters measured 75 x 110 cm.

Sightings: Heartland Ghost

In 2002, one of the stories featured on Sightings became the subject of a television movie on the Showtime network, called Sightings: Heartland Ghost. The movie tells the story of a Sightings crew sent to investigate a poltergeist haunting, eventually becoming victimized by the ghost themselves. The movie was later released on DVD.

References

External links

The Sightings Information Page

Fox Broadcasting Company original programming
Television series by CBS Studios
Paranormal television
1990s American television news shows
1992 American television series debuts
1997 American television series endings
UFO-related television